Jerai is a federal constituency in Yan District and Kuala Muda District , Kedah, Malaysia, that has been represented in the Dewan Rakyat since from 1959 to 1995, from 2004 to present.

The federal constituency was created in the 1958 redistribution and is mandated to return a single member to the Dewan Rakyat under the first past the post voting system.

Demographics 
https://live.chinapress.com.my/ge15/parliament/KEDAH

History
It was abolished in 1995 when it was redistributed. It was re-created in 2003.

Polling districts
According to the federal gazette issued on 31 October 2022, the Jerai constituency is divided into 53 polling districts.

Representation history

State constituency

Current state assembly members

Local governments

Election results

References
Keputusan Pilihan Raya Suruhanjaya Pilihan Raya (Election Commission of Malaysia)

Kedah federal constituencies